Progressive Brothers is an Indian electronic music duo band from New Delhi. The band consists of Sunny Sharma and Karan Bhalla; who are music producer, DJ, singer, and songwriter. Progressive Brothers have played at India's biggest electronic music festivals like Sunburn, VH1 Supersonic and Enchanted Valley Carnival. They have also performed at numerous events and college festivals across India.

History
The band was formed in 2012 by Sunny & Karan. Initially, Dj Karan was working for a multinational insurance company and Sunny was a banker. They eventually decided to pursue their career in music as "The Progressive Brothers". Their debut track "Veda" was in collaboration with Richard Durand.
  

They have shared the stage alongside David Guetta, Tiesto, Martin Garrix, Dmitri Vegas & Like Mike Dyro, KSHMR, Kygo, Oliver Heldens, R3HAB, Carnage, Steve Aoki, Benny Benassi, Dada Life, Seven Lions etc.

They were named India’s Best Trance Djs for 2012 – 2013 by Myfavdj Awards.

Discography

References

External links 
Official Website

Electronic dance music duos
Indian musical groups